For divisional competitions, see: 2011 Asian Five Nations division tournaments

The 2011 Asian Five Nations, known as the 2011 HSBC Asian 5 Nations due to the tournament's sponsorship by the HSBC, was the 4th series of the Asian Five Nations rugby union tournament.

The 2011 Asian 5 nations consisted of the best 5 teams in Asia; Hong Kong, Japan, Kazakhstan, Sri Lanka and the United Arab Emirates.

Sri Lanka qualified for the 2011 edition of the tournament by winning Division One of the 2010 tournament against Singapore 23–16. The United Arab Emirates also qualify with the disbanding of the Arabian Gulf rugby team, this is the first time both these teams have appeared in the top five.

Changes from 2010
 South Korea has been replaced with Sri Lanka, who earns promotion from Division 1.

Teams
The teams involved are:

Final Table

Points are awarded to the teams as follows:

Fixtures

Week 1

Touch judges:
 Anthony Tobi Lothian 
 D. Nimal

Week 2

Touch judges:

Week 3

Touch judges:

Week 4

Touch judges:

Week 5

Touch judges:

Media coverage
The tournament is broadcast live in many different countries, some of which are listed below:

References

External links
Official Website
ARFU

Asian
2011
Five Nations
Five Nations
2011 in Sri Lankan sport
2011 in Hong Kong sport
2011 in Kazakhstani sport
2011 in Emirati sport